Kristen Spours (born 11 April 2000) is an English figure skater. She has won five senior international medals and competed in the final segment at three World Junior Championships (2017, 2018, 2019).

Personal life 
Spours was born on 11 April 2000 in Kingston upon Thames, England. She attended Howard of Effingham School.

Career

Early years 
Spours began learning to skate in 2006, having become interested after watching Dancing on Ice. In the 2012–2013 season, she won the novice bronze medal at the British Championships.

2015–2016 season 
Making her first ISU Junior Grand Prix (JGP) appearance, Spours placed 21st in Bratislava, Slovakia. She finished fourth in the junior ladies' category at the British Championships. Her senior debut came in February 2016 at the Jégvirág Cup; she obtained the gold medal and the minimum technical scores to compete at the 2016 World Championships in Boston. As a result, she was named in the British team to senior Worlds, despite not appearing nationally on the senior level. She placed 36th in Boston. She was coached by Ruth Woodstock at Guildford Spectrum and Christian Newberry at the Lee Valley Ice Centre.

2016–2017 season 
Competing on the senior level, Spours won silver at the Denkova-Staviski Cup in October 2016 and bronze at the Merano Cup in November. In December 2016, she won the junior ladies' title and placed 5th on the senior level at the British Championships. In January 2017, she was awarded silver in the senior ladies' category at Skate Helena. In March, she placed 16th in the short program, 14th in the free skate, and 15th overall at the 2017 World Junior Championships in Taipei, Taiwan.

Programs

Competitive highlights 
CS: Challenger Series; JGP: Junior Grand Prix

References

External links 
 

2000 births
English female single skaters
Living people
People from Kingston upon Thames